Alborn may refer to:

Alborn Township, St. Louis County, Minnesota, a township in Saint Louis County, Minnesota, United States
Alborn, Minnesota, an unincorporated community in Alborn Township, Saint Louis County, Minnesota, United States

People with the surname
Alan Alborn (born 1980), American ski jumper
Ray Alborn (born 1938), American football player